Square knot insignia are embroidered cloth patches that represent awards of the Scout associations throughout the world.

The Scout Association of the United Kingdom uses a "figure-eight" knot and many Scouting organizations of the Commonwealth countries follow suit. The World Organization of the Scout Movement uses military-style ribbons. The Boy Scouts of America a square knot made of colored ropes is depicted; the colors are generally dictated by the award the insignia is associated with.

History

In the earliest days of the Scouting Movement military veterans were urged into service as Scoutmasters. The first Scout uniforms therefore resembled military uniforms. It was common for these veterans to wear their military decorations on their modified Boy Scout uniform — a national uniform was not to be developed until the early 1920s.

Military tradition dictated that the actual medal from a military award was only worn on ceremonial occasions — at other times, it was replaced with a thin ribbon bar with the same ribbon style as found attached to the medal. This carried over to Scouting, whose awards were medals, similar to the military, but were most often worn as ribbons.

The first country to switch over from military ribbons to a unique parallel was the United Kingdom, which introduced its knot emblems in 1922.

Boy Scouts of America

The Boy Scouts of America likewise moved away from allowing Scouters to wear military ribbons, but kept the style, introducing their own ribbons in place of medals in 1934. The BSA introduced its own square knot insignia in lieu of the military-style ribbons in 1947. The choice of the square knot as the common emblem was made by James E. West, who is said to have chosen it for its use as the knot associated with first aid, thereby reminding Scouts to continue to be of service to others.

The first eight awards with square knot insignia in the BSA were the Eagle Scout Award, Quartermaster Award, Scouter's Training Award, Scouter's Key, Silver Beaver Award, Silver Antelope Award, Silver Buffalo Award, and Honor Medal.

Since the introduction of square knot insignia, over forty new awards have been added, then combined, and some retired. Currently, there are 32 nationally authorized square knot insignia representing various medals, medallions, certificates, plaques, and other awards.

There are a few cases of local Council-approved square knots and various popular unofficial or spoof knots.

In the BSA, Square knot insignia are worn in rows of three across the top of the wearer's left pocket. Though there is no rule limiting the number of such insignia that may be worn, some suggest limiting to three rows of three. When fewer than 3 knots are worn in a particular row, knots are generally centered to the pocket, or the row below them.

Dates indicated in the chart below indicate the use of the square knot insignia for the particular award, and may not correspond to the history of the award itself. For example, the first Eagle Scout Award was presented in 1912, and there was a ribbon bar for it from 1934, and it was among the first eight awards given square knot insignia in 1947, so that later date is indicated.

Achievement Awards
These awards are generally earned by the Scouts themselves. 
These represent the highest youth rank or achievement in each respective program of the BSA.

Distinguished service
These awards are generally granted via nomination and review; they cannot be earned or applied for by Scouts or Scouters directly.

Heroism
These awards are generally granted via nomination and review; they cannot be earned or applied for by Scouts or Scouters directly.

Leadership and training
These awards are generally earned by the Scouters themselves.

Specialized achievements
These awards are generally earned by the Scouts and Scouters themselves. 
In one case (James E. West Fellowships) nomination by others is also possible.

Specialized service recognition
These awards are generally granted via nomination and review; they cannot be earned or applied for by Scouts or Scouters directly.

Discontinued
These awards have been completely discontinued or combined and represented by current award knots.

The Scout Association (UK)

The British Scout Association introduced the idea of a cloth 'knot' insignia in 1922, modeled after the military use of ribbons to represent medals and other citations. Many of the Scouting organizations of the Commonwealth of Nations either copy the British system or simply use the British awards and insignia.

Gallantry

Meritorious Conduct

Service

World Organization of the Scout Movement

External links

References

Boy Scouts of America
Scout and Guide awards
Advancement and recognition in the Boy Scouts of America
Decorative knots
Embroidery in the United States